Boateng is a Ghanaian surname. It is the fourth most common surname in Ghana. Notable people with the surname include:

A
Abrantee Boateng (born 1981), English presenter
Agyenim Boateng, Ghanaian lawyer
Agyenim Boateng Mensah (born 1996), Ghanaian footballer

B
Bismark Adjei-Boateng (born 1994), Ghanaian footballer

C
 Charles Boateng (footballer, born 1989), Ghanaian footballer
 Charles Boateng (footballer, born 1997), Ghanaian footballer

D
Daniel Jesse Boateng (born 1992), Ghanaian footballer
Daasebre Oti Boateng (born Emmanuel Oti Boateng, 1938–2021), Ghanaian statistician, academic, and traditional ruler.
Derek Boateng (born 1983), Ghanaian footballer

E
Emmanuel Boateng (born 1994), Ghanaian footballer 
Emmanuel Boateng (born 1996), Ghanaian footballer
Eric Boateng (born 1985), British basketball player

F
Francis Akwaffo-Boateng (born 1991), Ghanaian footballer
Frank Boateng (born 1984), Ghanaian footballer

G
George Boateng (born 1975), Dutch footballer
Gideon Boateng (born 1991), Ghanaian footballer
Georginio Wijnaldum (born 1990), Dutch footballer, was named Georginio Boateng at birth

H
Hiram Boateng (born 1996), English footballer

J
Jérôme Boateng (born 1988), German footballer
Joseph Boateng Danquah (born 1947), Ghanaian military officer
Joshua Boateng (born 1987), Ghanaian footballer
Josh Boateng

K
Kevin-Prince Boateng (born 1987), German-Ghanaian footballer 
Kennedy Boateng (footballer, born 1989), Ghanaian footballer
Kennedy Boateng (footballer, born 1996), Ghanaian footballer
Kingsley Boateng (born 1994), Ghanaian footballer
Kwabena Frimpong-Boateng (born 1950), Ghanaian cardiothoracic surgeon
Kwaku Boateng (1926–2006), Ghanaian politician
Kwaku Boateng (born 1974), Canadian high jumper
Kwame Boateng (born 1992), Ghanaian footballer
Kwame Boateng (English footballer) (born 1998), English footballer

M
Michael Boateng (born 1991), English footballer

N
Nelson Boateng (born 1968), Ghanaian sprinter
Nyan Boateng (born 1987), American footballer

O
Osei Boateng (born 1981), Ghanaian footballer
Ozwald Boateng (born 1967), British fashion designer

P
Paul Boateng (born 1951), British politician

R
Robert Boateng (born 1974), Ghanaian footballer
Richard Boateng (born 1992), Ghanaian footballer
Richard Kissi Boateng (born 1988), Ghanaian footballer

S
Sarpong Siriboe Boateng (born 1976), American musician

T
T A Boateng (1937-2011), Ghanaian educationist and scientist

References

Surnames of Akan origin